Elizabeth Gregory  (4 March 1901–22 October 1983) was a New Zealand university professor of home science. She was born in Dunedin, New Zealand, on 4 March 1901.

In the 1961 New Year Honours, Gregory was appointed an Officer of the Order of the British Empire.

Selected works
 Good nutrition : principles and menus, 1940
 A study of some New Zealand dietaries, 1934
 A study of fat metabolism with special reference to nutrition on diets devoid of fat, 1932

Legacy
 Elizabeth Gregory Scholarship at University of Otago

References

1901 births
1983 deaths
Academic staff of the University of Otago
People from Dunedin
New Zealand Officers of the Order of the British Empire
New Zealand women academics
New Zealand women scientists
New Zealand women writers